Conor O'Loughlin (born 16 July 1983) is a former Irish rugby union player for Connacht in the Celtic League. He played at scrum half. He retired due to a hip injury in 2011.

Following his rugby career O'Loughlin founded Glofox, a business management software development company that services fitness studios and gyms. The software is used in thousands of businesses worldwide.  In June 2016 Glofox announced that it had received funding from EI plus Growing Capital to the amount of €500K.

O'Loughlin currently acts in the capacity of CEO within the company.

Awards and honours
On 22 April 2018, OLoughlin received the title of Ireland's Best Young Entrepreneur for 2018.

References

1982 births
Living people
Buccaneers RFC players
Connacht Rugby players
Rugby union players from County Galway
Rugby union scrum-halves
Sportspeople from Galway (city)